Hothouse was an American medical drama television series that aired on ABC from June 13 until August 25, 1988. The series aired on Thursday Nights at 10:00 PM EST. Hothouse was cancelled because of low ratings.

Premise
The series was about a psychiatric clinic run by a family in Boston.

Cast
Josef Sommer as Dr. Sam Garrison
Alexis Smith as Lily Garrison Shannon
Art Malik as Dr. Ved Lahari
Michael Learned as Dr. Marie Teller
Louise Latham as Louise Dougherty
Katherine Borowitz as Issy Garrison Schrader
Bob Gunton as Leonard Schrader
Tony Soper as Matt Garrison
Susan Diol as Claudia Garrison
Michael Jeter as Dr. Art Makter
Maureen Moore as Lucy Cox

Episodes

Production
Jay Presson Allen tried to recapture the success of Family with Hothouse for ABC in 1988; the drama about the lives and work experiences of the staff of a mental hospital lasted eight episodes. Personally, Allen thought it was some of her best work, though its short life was a mixed blessing for her, said Allen: "Unfortunately, ABC didn't have the courage of their initial convictions. They skewered it, they turned tail on it. However if they had picked it up, I'd have had to turn out 26 episodes. I'd be in Forest Lawn now. Television is a killer. It is really not for sissies."

References

Bibliography

External links

1980s American drama television series
1988 American television series debuts
1988 American television series endings
1980s American medical television series
Television shows set in Boston
English-language television shows
American Broadcasting Company original programming
Television series by Warner Bros. Television Studios
Television series by Lorimar Television